is a popular Japanese pop singer, and former fashion model who debuted in the 1960s.

She is known for songs such as "Koi no Dorei" (恋の奴隷 English: "Slave of Love") and "Shuuchakueki" (終着駅 English: "Terminal Station"). Her cover of The Ventures recording, "Hokkaido Skies" sold over one million copies, and was awarded a gold disc. She followed this recording with another hit, "Ginza Lights".

"Koi no Dorei" was covered on GO!GO!7188's cover album, Tora no Ana.

On January 6, 2018, Okumura announced her retirement from the music industry.

Discography

Studio albums
 [1967.11.05] Kitaguni no Aoi Sora -Okumura Chiyo Hit Parade-
 [1968.11.01] Chiyo to Anata no Yoru
 [1969.06.01] Anata to Chiyo to...
 [1969.12.01] Anata Konomi no... Chiyo
 [1970.06.05] Kuyashīkeredo Shiawase yo
 [1971.06.05] Amai Seikatsu
 [1971.11.05] Chiyo no Ozashiki Uta
 [1972.05.05] Betsuri no Sanbika
 [1972.10.20] Hi no Ataru Basho
 [1973.05.20] Hikishio
 [1973.12.01] Kaze no Bojō
 [1974.08.05] Nanika Arisona Nishi Ginza
 [1980.11.21] Okumura Chiyo
 [1988.04.25] PRESENT -Genzai-

Live albums
 [1970.10.05] Night Club no Okumura Chiyo''

Singles
 [1965.03.05] "Anata ga Inakutemo"
 [1965.06.05] "Aa Kekkon"
 [1965.07.15] "September Moon"
 [1965.10.05] "Gomen ne Jirō"
 [1965.11.05] "Jingle Bells"
 [1966.01.05] "Omoide no Tango"
 [1966.03.05] "Hitoribocchi de"
 [1966.05.05] "Ienakatta no"
 [1966.08.05] "Watashi no Mune o Knock Shite"
 [1966.11.05] "Itsuka no Yakusoku"
 [1967.08.05] "Kitaguni no Aoi Sora"
 [1967.12.01] "Anata ni Aitai"
 [1968.02.01] "Namida Iro no Koi"
 [1968.06.01] "Aoi Tsukiyo"
 [1968.11.01] "Hana ni Naritai"
 [1969.03.01] "Yoru Yoso no Mama de"
 [1969.06.01] "Koi no Dorei"
 [1969.10.01] "Koi Dorobō"
 [1970.02.05] "Koi Kurui"
 [1970.05.05] "Kuyashīkeredo Shiawase yo"
 [1970.09.05] "Usodemo Īkara"
 [1970.12.01] "Chūtohanpa wa Yamete"
 [1971.04.05] "Amai Seikatsu"
 [1971.08.05] "Kawa no Nagare no Yōni"
 [1971.12.25] "Shūchakueki"
 [1972.04.25] "Betsuri no Sanbika"
 [1972.08.25] "Hi no Ataru Basho"
 [1972.12.20] "Onna no Koi Uta"
 [1973.04.20] "Hikishio"
 [1973.09.20] "Kaze no Bojō"
 [1973.12.25] "Naite Kyōto e"
 [1974.06.05] "Nanika Arisona Nishi Ginza"
 [1977.10.05] "Sōmatō"
 [1978.05.05] "Onna Uta"
 [1980.04.21] "Semete sayonara wa…"
 [1981.11.28] "Moi (Moa)"
 [1983.02.25] "Ashita Suteru kara"
 [1983.05.25] "Naze"
 [1984.06.25] "Wakarete Ageru"
 [1986.04.21] "Wasurenaide"
 [1988.02.21] "Kage"
 [1994.05.21] "Gaitō"
 [1995.05.05] "Koi no Dorei '95"
 [1995.05.05] "Shūchakueki '95"
 [1999.05.19] "Parōre Parōre"
 [2001.11.21] "TOKIO Tenshi" (duet with Ouyang Fei Fei)
 [2003.06.25] "Sugao no Mama no Anata de"
 [2004.08.25] "Aishite Aishite Aishichatta no yo"
 [2016.11.23] "Be With You -Anata ni Aeta-

Kōhaku Uta Gassen Appearances

References

Japanese women singers
1947 births
Living people
Musicians from Osaka Prefecture
People from Ikeda, Osaka
People of Shōwa-period Japan